Ņivņiki is a village located in Ludza District, Latvia.

Towns and villages in Latvia